Davaran may refer to:
 Davaran, Isfahan
 Davaran, Qaleh Ganj, Kerman Province
 Davaran, Rafsanjan, Kerman Province